Short-stature homeobox 2, also known as homeobox protein Og12X or paired-related homeobox protein SHOT, is a protein that in humans is encoded by the SHOX2 gene.

Function 

SHOX2 is a member of the homeobox family of genes that encode proteins containing a 60-amino acid residue motif that represents a DNA-binding domain. Homeobox proteins have been characterized extensively as transcriptional regulators involved in pattern formation in both invertebrate and vertebrate species.

Clinical significance 

Several human genetic disorders are caused by aberrations in human homeobox genes. This locus represents a pseudoautosomal homeobox gene that is thought to be responsible for idiopathic short stature, and it is implicated in the short stature phenotype of Turner syndrome patients. This gene is considered to be a candidate gene for Cornelia de Lange syndrome.

SHOX2 localises on chromosome 3, so it is an autosomal and not a pseudoautosomal homeobox (SHOX, which localises on the PAR1 region of chromosome X and Y, has a pseudoautosomal hereditability).

References

Further reading

__notoc__

Transcription factors